The Broxbourne Council election, 2006 was held to elect council members of the Broxbourne Borough Council, the local government authority of the borough of Broxbourne,  Hertfordshire, England.

Composition of expiring seats before election

Election results

Results summary 
An election was held in all 13 wards on 4 May 2006.

The Conservative Party gained a seat in Bury Green Ward from the independent "Bury Green Residents".

Martin Greensmyth who had won the seat for the "Bury Green Residents" in the 2002 Local Government Election stood for the Conservative Party in 2006 and retained his seat as a Conservative.

The new political balance of the council following this election was:

Conservative 35 seats
Labour 2 seats
British National Party 1 seat

The next Local Government Election will be held on 1 May 2007 when seats will be contested in all of the 13 wards.

Ward results

References

2006
2006 English local elections
2000s in Hertfordshire